Muaythai, for the 2013 World Combat Games was held at the Yubileiny - Sports Complex, 'Yubileiny' Hall, in Saint Petersburg, Russia. Preliminary rounds were done on the 19 and 21 October 2013. All the medal events was held on 23 October 2013.

Medal table
Key:

Medal summary

Men

Women

References

External links

2013 World Combat Games events
2013
Combat Games
Combat Games